Javier Andrés Alvial (born January 12, 1992, in Fairfax, Virginia) is a retired American and Chilean professional footballer who last played for San Luis de Quillota in Chile. He is currently working as the scouting and recruitment manager for the Portland Timbers in MLS.

Career

Youth
Alvial has been all over the world in his youth career. Playing in several top youth clubs such as Club Deportivo Universidad Católica in Chile, Club Atlético River Plate in Argentina, Defensor Sporting in Uruguay, Chivas USA in United States, Chelsea F.C. in England, etc.

It has been said that Alvial played in these clubs for a year or less in El Gráfico.
In an interview translated from Spanish to English, he states "because of my fathers job, I always had to be travelling from place to place which is why I could not stay in one club".

He then played for University of Alabama at Birmingham for a few months, but withdrew from the team in half season to pursue his dream of becoming a professional soccer player.

Professional
Alvial's first professional experience was with Puerto Rico Islanders at the age of 14, when well-known players such as Arturo Norambuena and Gustavo Barros Schelotto were playing. His other professional experiences were with Deportes Iquique, and Major League Soccer's Columbus Crew, and FC Dallas.

Alvial's last professional club was in 2013, playing for San Luis de Quillota in Quillota, Chile.

Personal life
Son of Jorge Alvial, Javier Alvial grew up in many different places outside of the United States such as Chile, Argentina, Uruguay, and Puerto Rico. In the states, he grew up in Georgia, Florida, and Virginia. He's the youngest out of the two older siblings he has.

References

External links
 

1992 births
Living people
Soccer players from Virginia
American soccer players
Sportspeople of Chilean descent
American expatriate soccer players
United States men's youth international soccer players
Citizens of Chile through descent
Chilean footballers
Chilean expatriate footballers
Puerto Rico Islanders players
FC Dallas players
Atlanta Silverbacks players
Primera B de Chile players
San Luis de Quillota footballers
Expatriate footballers in Chile
American expatriate sportspeople in Chile
Association football midfielders
Naturalized citizens of Chile
American expatriate sportspeople in Argentina
American expatriate sportspeople in Uruguay
American expatriate sportspeople in Mexico
American expatriate sportspeople in England
Chilean expatriate sportspeople in Puerto Rico
Chilean expatriate sportspeople in Argentina
Chilean expatriate sportspeople in Uruguay
Chilean expatriate sportspeople in Mexico
Chilean expatriate sportspeople in England
Expatriate footballers in Argentina
Expatriate footballers in Uruguay
Expatriate footballers in Mexico
Expatriate footballers in England